ESPN Full Court was an out-of-market sports package in the United States that carried college basketball games. The package consisted of about 150 games annually, from the season tipoff in November to the first two rounds of the NCAA Women's Division I Basketball Championship in mid- to late-March. The suggested retail price was $109 for the entire season, $75 for a half-season (only available in late January), and $19.95 for a single day.  The season package was renewable.  Full-season packages were not available for the online version.

On August 28, 2015, the channel was replaced by ESPN College Extra and the package was much less promoted or available than it has been in the past with the drawing down of pay-per-view to select special events; all of Full Court's events are available through WatchESPN via various ESPN3 streams without cost through TV Everywhere authentication.

Other Out-of-Market / pay-per-view sports packages
NFL Sunday Ticket
MLB Extra Innings
NBA League Pass
NHL Center Ice
NASCAR Hot Pass
ESPN GamePlan
MLS Direct Kick

External links
 Official site

Full Court
College basketball on television in the United States
Out-of-market sports packages
Defunct television networks in the United States
Television channels and stations established in 2007
Television channels and stations disestablished in 2015